The First Working Cabinet,, was an Indonesian
cabinet that served from 9 July 1959 until 18 February 1960, when President Sukarno reshuffled
it.

Composition

Cabinet Leadership
Prime Minister: Sukarno
 Deputy Prime Minister: Djuanda Kartawidjaja

Cabinet Members
Minister of Defense and Security : Lt. Gen. Abdul Haris Nasution
Minister of Foreign Affairs: Subandrio
Minister of Finance: Djuanda
Minister of Production: Col. Suprajogi
Minister of Distribution: Johannes Leimena
Minister of Public Prosperity: Muljadi Djojomartono
Minister of Home Affairs and Autonomy: Ipik Gandamana
Minister of Social and Cultural Affairs: Muhammad Yamin

Ex Officio Ministers of State
Minister/Army Chief of Staff: Lt. Gen. A. H. Nasution
Minister/Air Force Chief of Staff: Air Marshal S. Surjadarma
Minister/Navy Chief of Staff: Captain R. E. Martadinata
Minister/National Police Chief of Staff: Chief Commissioner Said Sukanto Tjokroatmodjo
Attorney General ad-interim: Gatot Tarunamihardia
Minister/Vice Chairman of the Supreme Advisory Council: Ruslan Abdulgani
Minister/Chairman of the National Planning Council: Muhammad Yamin

Junior Ministers

First Ministerial Section
Junior Minister of Information: Maladi
Junior Minister of People's Mobilization: Soedjono and Sudjono (joint ministers)
Junior Minister of Relations with the Legislature: W. J. Rumambi
Junior Minister of Relations with Religious Scholars: Fatah Jasin
Junior Minister of Defense: Maj. Gen. Hidajat
Junior Minister of Justice: Sahardjo
Junior Minister of Police: Chief Commissioner Said Sukanto Tjokroatmodjo
Junior Minister of Veteran Affairs: Col. Sambas Atmadinata

Financial Section
Junior Minister of Finance: Notohamiprodjo

Production Affairs
Junior Minister of Agriculture: Col. Azis Saleh
Junior Minister of Public Works and Power: Sardjono Dipokusumo
Junior Minister of Labor: Ahem Erningpradja

Distribution Section
Junior Minister of Maritime Transportation: Abdul Mutalib Danuningrat
Junior Minister of Land Transportation and Post, Telegraph and Telephones: Maj. Gen. Djatikoesoemo
Junior Minister of Air Transportation: Colonel R. Iskander
Junior Minister of Trade: Arifin Harahap

Development Section
Junior Minister of People's Industry: R. Suharto
Junior Minister of Basic Industries and Mining: Chairul Saleh
Junior Minister of Agrarian Affairs: Sadjarwo
Junior Minister of Transmigration, Cooperatives & Development of Village Communities: Achmadi

Public Welfare Section
Junior Minister of Welfare: Colonel Satrio
Junior Minister of Religion: Wahid Wahab
Junior Minister of Social Affairs: Muljadi Djojomartono

Social & Cultural Section
Junior Minister of Education & Culture: Prijono

Changes
 Johannes Leimena was appointed Deputy First Minister on 27 July 1959. He retained his job as Distribution Minister
 On 30 July 1959, the Social-Cultural Section was abolished. The Junior Minister of Education & Culture was moved to the First Ministerial Section. Muhammad Yamin was appointed Chairman of the National Planning Agency and became an ex officio minister.
 on 15 August, Sultan Hamengkubuwana IX was appointed Minister/Chairman of the State Apparatus Oversight Agency and Roeslan Abdulgani became acting Chairman of the Supreme Advisory council and ex officio minister.
 On 22 September 1956, Attorney General ad-interim Gatot Tarunamihardja was replaced by Zainal Abidin.
 On 15 December 1959, Junior Minister of Police Said Sukanto Tjokroatmodjo was replaced by Chief Commissioner Soekarno Djojonegoro.

References
 
 

Cabinets of Indonesia
1959 establishments in Indonesia
1960 disestablishments in Indonesia
Cabinets established in 1959
Cabinets disestablished in 1960